The 1999 French motorcycle Grand Prix was the fourth round of the 1999 Grand Prix motorcycle racing season. It took place on 23 May 1999 at Le Castellet.

500 cc classification

250 cc classification

125 cc classification

Championship standings after the race (500cc)

Below are the standings for the top five riders and constructors after round four has concluded. 

Riders' Championship standings

Constructors' Championship standings

 Note: Only the top five positions are included for both sets of standings.

Notes

References

French motorcycle Grand Prix
French
Motorcycle Grand Prix